In economics, aggregate expenditure (AE) is a measure of national income. Aggregate expenditure is defined as the current value of all the finished goods and services in the economy. The aggregate expenditure is thus the sum total of all the expenditures undertaken in the economy by the factors during a given time period. It is the expenditure incurred on consumer goods, planned investment and the expenditure made by the government in the economy. In an open economy scenario, aggregate expenditure also includes the difference between the exports and the imports.

Aggregate expenditures is defined as 
  = Household Consumption
  = Planned Investment
  = Government spending
  = Net exports (Exports − Imports)

Aggregate expenditure provides one way to calculate the sum total of all economic activity in an economy, which is referred to as the gross domestic product of an economy. The gross domestic product is calculated through the aggregate expenditure model, also known as the Keynesian cross. AE is also used in the aggregate demand-aggregate supply model which advances the aggregate expenditures model with the inclusion of price changes.

Aggregate demand (AD) refers to the sum total of goods that are demanded in an economy over a period and thus AD is defined by the planned total expenditure in an economy for a given price level.

Components
Various schools of thoughts use various components to come up with the Aggregate Expenditure. The major schools of economic thought, which are the classical and Keynesian economists, use the following components:

Consumption
Consumption is the household consumption over a given period of time. The total household consumption can be divided into two parts: Autonomous Consumption and Induced consumption. Autonomous Consumption is the amount of consumption regardless of the amount of income; hence, even if income is zero, the autonomous consumption would be the total consumption. Induced consumption refers to the level of consumption dependent on the level of income.

Investment
Investment is the amount of expenditure on capital goods. Investment is the expenditure on goods that are expected to yield a return or increase their own value over time. Investment expenditure can be further divided into two parts, planned investment and unplanned investment. Over the long run the sum of differences in the unplanned investment would equal zero as economy approaches equilibrium.

Government Expenditure
The Keynesian model propagates an active state to control and regulate the economy. The government can make expenditure in terms of infrastructure, and thus increase the total expenditure in the economy as advocated by Keynes. Transfer payments (such as pensions and unemployment benefits) are not included in G as that would mean a double count.

Net Exports
In an open economy, the total expenditure in the economy also includes the components of net exports, which is total exports minus total imports.

Income (Y)'''
Income is the sum of the various components wage income, profit income, and rental income.

Classical economics

Classical economists relied on Say's law, which states that supply creates its own demand, which stemmed from the belief that wages, prices, and interest rates are all flexible. This comes from the classical thought that the factor payments which are made to the various factors of production during the production process would create enough income in the economy to create a demand for the products produced. This revolves around Adam Smith's invisible hand, which states that the markets would achieve equilibrium via the market forces that impact economic activity and thus there is no need for government intervention. Moreover, the classical economists believed that the economy was operating at a full employment.

Classical economics has been criticized for its assumptions that the economy works at a full-employment equilibrium which is empirically false, since the economy often operates at an under-employment equilibrium mainly because of "sticky" wages, which in turn provides the foundation for the Keynesian model of aggregate expenditure.

Keynesian economics
Keynesian economics believes, contrary to classical thought, that wages, prices and interest rates are not flexible and hence violate Say's law, which provided the foundation for the maxim that "supply creates its own demand". Keynes believed that the economy was subject to sticky prices and thus the economy was not in a state of perpetual equilibrium and also operated at an under-employment equilibrium. Keynesian economics calls for government intervention and is called demand-side economics as it believes that aggregate demand and not aggregate supply determines the GDP because of the difference between the aggregate supply and planned expenditure in an economy. Hence Keynes believed that the government played an important role in the determination on the aggregate expenditure in an economy and thus included government expenditure in the aggregate expenditure function.

Keynesian economics preaches that in times of a recession, the government must undertake increased expenditure to compensate for the insufficiency in household expenditure and private investment, so as to ensure that sufficient demand is maintained in the goods market. This also leads to the Keynesian multiplier which suggests that every dollar spent on investment or government creates a multiplier effect and leads to an increased expenditure of more than one dollar.

Aggregate supply

An economy is said to be in equilibrium when aggregate expenditure is equal to aggregate supply (production) in the economy. According to Keynes, the economy does not stay in a perpetual state of equilibrium but aggregate expenditure and aggregate supply adjust each other towards equilibrium. When there is an excess supply over expenditure, and hence over demand, there is an inventory leftover with the producers, which leads to a reduction in either the prices or the quantity of output and hence reducing the total output (GDP) of the economy. On the other hand, if there is an excess of expenditure over supply, then there is excess demand leading to an increase in prices or output. Hence the economy constantly keeps shifting between excess supply (inventory) and excess demand. Thus, the economy is constantly moving towards an equilibrium between aggregate expenditure and aggregate supply. In an under-employment equilibrium the Keynesian cross refers to the point of intersection of the aggregate supply and the aggregate expenditure curve. A rise in expenditure by either Consumption, Investment or the Government or an increase in exports or a decrease in imports leads to a rise in the aggregate expenditure and thus pushes the economy towards a higher equilibrium and thus reaching a higher level towards the potential GDP.

See also
 Aggregate income

References

Parry G., and Kemp S., (2009) Discovering Economics Tactic Publications, South Perth.

Gross domestic product
Macroeconomic aggregates
Expenditure